Scott Matthew Logan (born 24 July 1976) is a former swimmer who competed for Australia at the 1996 Summer Olympics in Atlanta, Georgia.

Logan trained under Bernie Wakefield. He swam in the 4×100-metre freestyle relay alongside Michael Klim, Matthew Dunn and Chris Fydler at the 1996 Olympics.  Logan also represented Australia at the 1997 FINA World Swimming Championships (25 m) and the 1997 Pan Pacific Swimming Championships.

References
Historical Australian Swim Team
Sports Reference

1976 births
Living people
Australian male freestyle swimmers
Swimmers at the 1996 Summer Olympics
Olympic swimmers of Australia
Swimmers from Brisbane
Sportsmen from Queensland
Medalists at the FINA World Swimming Championships (25 m)
People educated at Brisbane State High School
20th-century Australian people